Manya is an Indian actress who mainly   acted in Malayalam and Telugu films along with a few Kannada movies. She began her acting career in Telugu cinema. In 2000, she was introduced to Malayalam films by director Lohithadas and acted in Joker opposite Dileep. The success of the movie led to a series of more Malayalam movies films outside her mother language, Telugu.

Personal life

Manya born to Prahladan who was a doctor in England and Padmini in Naidu family of Andhra Pradesh, grew up in England and moved to South India at the age of 9. She has a younger sister, Anjana. Manya married Satya Patel on 31 May 2008. Later they got divorced. In 2013 Manya married Vikas Bajpai, they have a daughter born in 2016.

Career

She started modelling at the age of 14, as a child artist. She soon started acting and went on to act in more than 40 movies in many South Indian languages. She holds a dual degree in maths and statistics, minoring in quantitative finance; she also pursued an MBA from Columbia University. She worked as Assistant Vice President in Credit Suisse, New York. Currently working with Citi as Vice President.

Other awards

 2002: Drisya Television & Audio Awards: Best Actress (Special Jury) Award : Kanmani, 2002 (Malayalam) (Asianet)

Filmography

Television

References

External links

Manya's Official Page

Living people
Actresses in Malayalam cinema
Actresses in Tamil cinema
Actresses in Telugu cinema
Indian film actresses
Actresses in Kannada cinema
Indian emigrants to the United States
1982 births
Columbia Business School alumni
20th-century Indian actresses
21st-century Indian actresses
Actresses in Malayalam television